The Navotas Uni-Pak Sardines were a professional basketball team based in Navotas, Philippines that last played in the Maharlika Pilipinas Basketball League (MPBL). The team played its home games at the Navotas Sports Complex.

History
They joined the Maharlika Pilipinas Basketball League as the Navotas Clutch, as one of the ten charter teams during its inaugural season. The team has made the playoffs in its first two seasons but hasn't advanced past the first round on both occasions.

The team changed its name to the Navotas Uni-Pak Sardines for the 2019-20 season, which is currently their last season of play as of 2023.

Current roster

Head coaches

Season-by-season records
Records from the 2019-20 MPBL season:

References

Navotas Clutch
2018 establishments in the Philippines
Basketball teams established in 2018
Sports teams in Metro Manila
Maharlika Pilipinas Basketball League teams